St Kilda, Australia may refer to:
St Kilda, Victoria,a suburb of Melbourne
St Kilda, South Australia, a suburb of Adelaide
St Kilda, Queensland, a locality in the Bundaberg Region

See also
St Kilda (disambiguation)